The La Crescent Public Library is a library in La Crescent, Minnesota.  It is a member of Southeastern Libraries Cooperating, the SE Minnesota library region.

References

External links 
 GoogleMap to library
 Online Catalog
 Southeastern Libraries Cooperating

Southeastern Libraries Cooperating
Buildings and structures in Houston County, Minnesota
Education in Houston County, Minnesota
Public libraries in Minnesota